Fusilier Peak is a  peak in British Columbia, Canada. 
It is part of the Tower of London Range of the Muskwa Ranges in the Canadian Rockies. 

Fusilier Peak was named by the Royal Fusiliers (City of London Regiment) Canadian Rocky Mountains Expedition 1960, a small expedition with members from a regiment based in the Tower of London.  The expedition named several peaks after the Tower, including The White Tower, North Bastion Mountain, South Bastion Mountain and Tower Mountain, which overlooks the south end of Wokkpash Lake.

References

Sources

Two-thousanders of British Columbia
Canadian Rockies
Peace River Land District